Corydiinae is a subfamily of the order Blattodea (cockroaches). Many are known as sand cockroaches. The subfamily, comprising about 20 genera, contains half the genera in Corydiidae. One prominent species is the desert cockroach, Arenivaga investigata.

Genera

Corydiinae
 Anosigamia
 Arenivaga
 Austropolyphaga
 Eremoblatta
 Ergaula
 Eucorydia
 Eupolyphaga
 Hemelytroblatta
 Heterogamisca
 Heterogamodes
 Homoeogamia
 Hypercompsa
 Leiopteroblatta
 Mononychoblatta
 Nymphrytria
 Polyphaga
 Polyphagina
 Polyphagoides
 Therea

References

Corydiidae
Cockroaches